Joseph Edwin Warner (March 14, 1870 – April 16, 1956) was a member of the Michigan House of Representatives.

Warner was born and raised in Ypsilanti Township, Michigan. He worked as a dairy farmer when not involved in politics. A Republican, he served in the Michigan House from 1921–1930 and again from 1937–1956. Warner was a member of the state house at the time of his death.  

Warner was a supporter of the operations and growth of Eastern Michigan University. There is a building at Eastern Michigan University named after Warner.

Sources
Joseph Edwin Warner entry at The Political Graveyard
plaque on Warner in Joseph Warner Building

External links

1870 births
1956 deaths
Members of the Michigan House of Representatives
People from Washtenaw County, Michigan
Dairy farmers